Ukrainian Front may refer to several Soviet fronts of the Russian Civil War and the World War II:
Ukrainian Front (1919), formerly the Army Group of Kursk Direction
Ukrainian Front (1939) formed during the Polish September Campaign
1st Ukrainian Front, renamed from Voronezh Front on October 20, 1943.
2nd Ukrainian Front, renamed from Steppe Front on October 20, 1943.
3rd Ukrainian Front, renamed from Southwestern Front on October 20, 1943.
4th Ukrainian Front, formed in late 1943.